No smoking may refer to:
Smoking ban
 No Smoking (1951 film), a Disney cartoon featuring Goofy
 No Smoking (1955 film), a British comedy film
No Smoking (2007 film), an Indian psychological thriller directed by Anurag Kashyap and starring John Abraham
"No Smoking" (Cow and Chicken episode)
No Smoking, one segment of the 1993 film Smoking/No Smoking directed by Alain Resnais

See also
No symbol, which with a cigarette added becomes an international symbol for "no smoking"
Nosmo King (disambiguation), a name used by several entertainment personalities which is based on the term "No smoking"